Christian Steiger (born 5 May 1978) is a Swiss sailor. He competed in the 49er event at the 2004 Summer Olympics.

References

External links
 

1978 births
Living people
Swiss male sailors (sport)
Olympic sailors of Switzerland
Sailors at the 2004 Summer Olympics – 49er
Sportspeople from Belo Horizonte